Muhammad Bashir (born 1930) is a Pakistani weightlifter. He competed in the men's featherweight event at the 1956 Summer Olympics.

References

External links
 

1930 births
Possibly living people
Pakistani male weightlifters
Olympic weightlifters of Pakistan
Weightlifters at the 1956 Summer Olympics
Place of birth missing (living people)
20th-century Pakistani people